Juan José "Juanjo" Díaz Galiana (8 January 1949 – 6 December 2017), sometimes known simply as Juanjo, was a Spanish football manager.

Career
RCD Espanyol appointed the little-known Diaz to replace Benito Joanet in January 1990. Diaz would lead Espanyol to the 1989–90 Segunda División play-offs, where the club won promotion following a victory over CD Málaga. He left the club immediately after the play-offs.

In June 2001 Juanjo was named as manager of second-division side CD Badajoz. That October, however, he was relieved of his duties after winning only two points out of a possible 27.

He died in Terrassa, Catalonia, at the age of 68, following a long illness.

References

External links

1949 births
2017 deaths
People from Ciudad Real
Sportspeople from the Province of Ciudad Real
Spanish football managers
La Liga managers
Segunda División managers
CE L'Hospitalet managers
RCD Espanyol managers
Palamós CF managers
SD Huesca managers
FC Andorra managers
UE Cornellà managers
FC Cartagena managers
CD Badajoz managers